The 2006 Formula BMW ADAC season was a multi-event motor racing championship for open wheel, formula racing cars held across Europe. The championship featured drivers competing in 1.2 litre Formula BMW single seat race cars. The 2006 season was the ninth Formula BMW ADAC season organized by BMW Motorsport and ADAC.  The season began at Hockenheimring on 8 April and finished at the same place on 29 October, after eighteen races.

Christian Vietoris was crowned series champion.

Driver lineup

2006 Schedule
The series supported the Deutsche Tourenwagen Masters at seven rounds, with additional rounds at the European Grand Prix on May 5–7th on 2–4 June and the WTCC Race of Germany.

Results

Championship standings
Points are awarded as follows:

† — Drivers did not finish the race, but were classified as they completed over 90% of the race distance.

References

External links
 Formula BMW ADAC 2006 on adac-motorsport.de

Formula BMW seasons
Formula BMW ADAC
BMW ADAC